IARS is a human gene.

IARS may also refer to:
 International Anesthesia Research Society
 Illawarra Amateur Radio Society
 Iraqi Amateur Radio Society
 Institute of Arab Research and Studies